Hillia is a genus of moths of the family Noctuidae.

Species
 Hillia acronyctina Köhler, 1952
 Hillia iris (Zetterstedt, 1839)
 Hillia maida (Dyar, 1904)
 Hillia schildei

References
Natural History Museum Lepidoptera genus database
Hillia at funet

Cuculliinae